Three Forks is a locale where the main fork of the Owyhee River converges with the North Fork and Middle Fork in Malheur County, Oregon.

It was the site of the Battle of Three Forks during the Snake War, May 27–28, 1866. Remains of a historical military road built to access the area are still visible on the canyon's west side.

References

Lakes of Malheur County, Oregon
Locale (geographic)